Turkish Hard Coal Enterprises (TTK) is the heavily subsidized state owned enterprise which has a virtual monopoly in mining, processing and distribution, including importing, of hard coal in Turkey. According to 21st century data up to 2014 Armutcuk, Karadon and Uzulmez were more hazardous than Amasra and Kozlu mines. Although coal mining accidents in Turkey decreased considerably after the government introduced tougher safety measures in the mid-2010s, the relative danger compared to other occupations since then is not publicly known, as the government restricted access to workplace death statistics. TTK made a loss throughout the 2000s and 2010s: 112,100 lira ($) was lost (operating loss) per employee in 2019.

TTK only sells to the public sector.

Sources

Notes

References

External links 
 TTK article Global Energy Monitor

Organizations established in 1983
Mining organizations
Government agencies of Turkey
Coal in Turkey